The 2010 FIA GT1 Interlagos round is an auto racing event held at the Autódromo José Carlos Pace, São Paulo, Brazil on 27–28 November 2010, and served as the ninth round of the 2010 FIA GT1 World Championship season.  The event shared the weekend with the final round of the Brazilian GT Championship. The All-Brazilian pairing of Enrique Bernoldi and Alexandre Negrão of the Vitaphone Racing Team Maserati earned pole position. The Young Driver AMR partnership of Tomáš Enge and Darren Turner took the checkered flag in the Qualifying Race by overtaking the Maserati of Bernoldi and Negrão during the pit-stops.

Qualifying

Qualifying result
For qualifying, Driver 1 participates in the first and third sessions while Driver 2 participates in only the second session.  The fastest lap for each session is indicated with bold.

Qualifying Race

Race result

Championship Race

Race result

References

External links
 Interlagos GT1 Race in Brazil – FIA GT1 World Championship

Interlagos
FIA GT1